is the Japanese author of the light novel and manga series Re:Zero − Starting Life in Another World. The series has been adapted into an anime.

Nagatsuki initially serialized the series as web novel (writing under the username ) on the user-generated content site Shōsetsuka ni Narō from April 20, 2012 onwards.  , he has published six novels and two side stories, comprising a total of 429 chapters. Following the web novel's publication, Media Factory acquired the series for print publication. As of September 2016, nine volumes have been published, as well as two side story volumes and two short story collections. The series adapted into anime, manga and visual novel. Nagatsuki was very active in the production of the anime, attending script meetings, recording sessions, and dubbing.

Works

References

External links

 

Japanese novelists
Light novelists
Living people
Year of birth missing (living people)